New Bedford Friends Meeting House, also known as New Bedford Friends Meeting, is a Quaker house of worship in New Bedford, Massachusetts.  This meeting house has since 1822 been the home to the New Bedford Meeting of the Religious Society of Friends (Quakers); the meeting meets every Sunday at 10:00 a.m.

Background
Quakers settled in Dartmouth near Buzzards Bay in the seventeenth century. They were among the first colonial settlers in the area. In the 17th century Dartmouth was a large area that now encompasses Acushnet, Fairhaven, New Bedford, and Westport.

Quakers settled where the farmland was most fertile, without establishing a town center. The Apponegansett Meeting House was established in 1699 and expanded three times by 1743. As the membership grew, additional meeting houses were established in Westport and at Allen's Neck.

First meeting house
In 1785, a meeting house was built on Spring Street, in what is now New Bedford.  Because there were a number of Quakers in Dartmouth, it became a place of religious acceptance, according to Ann Gidley Lowry, an author of Quaker history. Some of their neighbors were Baptists, who believed in religious freedom.

Friends Meeting House (1822)
The Friends Meeting House was built in 1822 on the site of the first religious building in Old Bedford Village, on land that was donated by Joseph Rotch in 1785. A simple and sober building, it has separate entrances for men and women. It is an external reflection of Quaker beliefs in simplicity.

Some Quakers in the Dartmouth and Nantucket area engaged in the whaling industry. Residents, like Charles W. Morgan, owned and captained whaling ships. Other industries that relied upon or supported the whaling industry were established, such as a candleworks that made candles out of whale oil. Some of the Quakers from New Bedford were businessmen.

The town of New Bedford became a sanctuary for fugitive slaves, aided by the Quakers. The town became a major Underground Railroad station, due to the Quakers' belief in equality. In 1834, a branch of the Anti-Slavery Society was found in New Bedford.

In his 1845 autobiography Narrative of the Life of Frederick Douglass, Frederick Douglass mentions two men who were members of New Bedford Monthly Meeting -- William C. Taber and Joseph Ricketson -- because of their assistance in helping Douglass and his wife get to New Bedford from Newport, Rhode Island when he was escaping enslavement. "They seemed at once to understand our circumstances, and gave us such assurance of their friendliness as put us fully at ease in their presence. It was good indeed to meet with such friends, at such a time," Douglass wrote of Taber and Ricketson. William C. Taber led Quaker congregation's business meetings of New Bedford Monthly Meeting from 1835 until early 1852. He was also the meeting's treasurer from 1831 through 1848.

Members
New Bedford Meeting's members have included Captain John Howland Jr., who partnered with his brother James, in the firm J. and J. Howland. George Howland Jr., who also lived on Sixth Street, was a businessman and the fifth major of New Bedford. He was the son of Ann Howland Dunbar, the daughter of John Howland Jr., and Elisha Dunbar, a successful whaling merchant. George Howland Sr., married to Susan (Howland) Howland, was one of the very wealthy whaling merchants. Of his ships, one of them was named the George and Susan, which was launched on their wedding day in 1811. Frederick Douglass said of his former employers, George Howland Sr. was "a hard driver, but a good paymaster, and I got on well with him."

Susan Howland  and Rachel Howland  were Quaker ministers who were members of New Bedford Meeting in the nineteenth century. 

The Grinnell family, which includes bankers Cornelius Grinnell and his son Joseph Grinnell, were early settlers in New Bedford.

References

Quaker meeting houses in Massachusetts
Churches in New Bedford, Massachusetts